Chenevix is a surname, and may refer to:

Helen Chenevix (1890–1963), Irish suffragist and trade unionist
Richard Chenevix (bishop) (1698–1779), Church of Ireland Bishop of Waterford and Lismore.
Richard Chenevix (chemist) (c. 1774–1830), Irish chemist, mineralogist and playwright
Melesina Trench (née Chenevix, previously St George; 1768 – 1827), Irish writer

See also
Anthony Chenevix-Trench 
Cesca Chenevix Trench
Charles Chenevix Trench 
Francis Chenevix Trench
Georgia Chenevix-Trench
Richard Chenevix Trench